The 2017–18 Olympique Lyonnais Féminin season was the club's fourteenth season since FC Lyon joined OL as its women's section. Olympique Lyonnais retained their Division 1 Féminine and UEFA Women's Champions League titles, and where Runners Up to Paris Saint-Germain in the Coupe de France Féminine.

Season events
On 18 August, Olympique Lyonnais announced the signing of Lucy Bronze from Manchester City to a three-year contract.

On 29 August, Olympique Lyonnais announced the signing of Shanice van de Sanden from Liverpool to a three-year contract.

On 9 September it was announced that Amandine Henry would return to Olympique Lyonnais on a three-and-a-half year contract from 1 January.

On 1 January, Morgan Gautrat joined Olympique Lyonnais from Chicago Red Stars on a contract until the summer of 2020.

Squad

Transfers

In

Out

Loans out

Released

Friendlies

Competitions

Overview

Division 1

Results summary

Results by matchday

Results

Table

Coupe de France

UEFA Champions League

Final

Squad statistics

Appearances 

|-
|colspan="14"|Players away from the club on loan:
|-
|colspan="14"|Players who appeared for Olympique Lyonnais but left during the season:

|}

Goal scorers

Clean sheets

Disciplinary record

References 

Olympique Lyonnais
Olympique Lyonnais Féminin